John D. 'Jack' Semler is an American ice hockey coach and former player who was the first head coach for Maine.

Career
Jack Semler played at Vermont for four seasons during the short period when it was a Division II program. After graduating he eventually rose to become the head coach at Princeton. After four unproductive seasons with the Tigers he accepted the post to be the first head coach for Maine's ice hockey program. Semler posted winning records in both seasons that Maine played in Division II and helped the Black Bears to a good showing in their first year at the Division I level. The program slumped a bit beginning in 1981–82, and though improvement was shown in his final season, Semler left the college ranks in 1984.

Semler would continue coaching but wouldn't return to the NCAA until 2006 when he became an assistant for Skidmore College. After stops at both Assumption College and Nichols College Semler ended up at Rice Memorial High School.

Head coaching record

References

External links

Living people
Year of birth missing (living people)
American ice hockey coaches
Vermont Catamounts men's ice hockey players
Princeton Tigers men's ice hockey coaches
Maine Black Bears men's ice hockey coaches
Ice hockey coaches from Connecticut
People from Salisbury, Connecticut
Ice hockey players from Connecticut